Elaeus or Elaious was a deme of ancient Attica.

The site of Elaeus is tentatively located east of Magoula.

References

Populated places in ancient Attica
Former populated places in Greece
Demoi